Andrew Martin may refer to:

Sports
Andrew Martin (cyclist) (born 1961), cyclist from Guam
Andrew Martin (javelin thrower) (born 1980), Australian Olympic athlete
Test (wrestler) (Andrew James Robert Patrick Martin, 1975–2009), Canadian professional wrestler

Politics
Andrew Martin (Nevada politician) (born 1964), member of the Nevada Assembly
Andrew Martin (Wisconsin politician), Wisconsin state assemblyman

Other
Andrew Martin (computer scientist), English computer scientist
Andrew Martin (novelist) (born 1962), English novelist and journalist
Andrew Martin (British Army officer) (1914–1993)
Andrew Martin ("The Bicentennial Man"), the protagonist of Isaac Asimov's "The Bicentennial Man"
Andrew D. Martin (born 1972), political scientist, chancellor of Washington University in St. Louis
A. Frank Martin (1894–1982), American founder of Kappa Kappa Psi fraternity

See also
Andy Martin (disambiguation)
Andrew Marton (1904–1992), Hungarian-American film director